The Ministry of Education  is one of the ministries of the Government of Romania.

Former names of the Ministry 

Over the years the Ministry changed its title. Initially it was called Ministry of Religion and Public Instruction , then Ministry of Public Instruction, then it changed to Ministry of Teaching, Ministry of Teaching and Science, then changed back to Ministry of Teaching. When Andrei Marga became Minister, it introduced the largest reform measures, starting with the name of the institution: Ministry of National Education. In 2000 the name was changed to Ministry of Education and Research. This title was kept until April 2007, when it changed to Ministry of Education, Research and Youth. On 21 December 2012 the title was changed to Ministry of National Education and was kept until 17 December 2014, when it changed to Ministry of National Education and Scientific Research This title was kept until 4 January 2017, when it changed back to Ministry of National Education.

Ministers

Since 1989

External links 

 EDU.ro
 
 GUV.ro

References 

Education
Educational organizations based in Romania
Romania